T. concinna may refer to:

 Tenaturris concinna, a sea snail
 Terebra concinna, a sea snail
 Thymophylla concinna, a flowering plant
 Triglochin concinna, a circumboreal arrowgrass
 Trigonotoma concinna, a ground beetle
 Turcica concinna, a sea snail
 Turnera concinna, a flowering plant